Raphael Cruz  (September 5, 1986 - January 26, 2018) was an American acrobat, clown and actor.  Cruz is known for having played the lead role of Buster, a Buster Keaton inspired character, in the cinema themed Cirque du Soleil production Iris.

Cruz died in Paris on January 26, 2018, from heart and lung failure.

References

External links

1986 births
2018 deaths
Acrobats
Cirque du Soleil performers
American male film actors
Hispanic and Latino American male actors
American male stage actors
American circus performers
American clowns
Actors from Vallejo, California